Joe Cocker! is the second studio album by English singer Joe Cocker, released in November 1969. Following the template of his first LP, the album features numerous covers of songs originally performed by Bob Dylan ("Dear Landlord"), the Beatles ("She Came in Through the Bathroom Window" and "Something" – both released almost simultaneously with original versions; "Let It Be" was also recorded and released as a B-side), Leonard Cohen ("Bird on the Wire"), and future touring partner Leon Russell ("Delta Lady" and “Hello Little Friend”). Cocker also co-wrote one song, "That's Your Business Now", with Chris Stainton, who was a frequent songwriting partner.

Cocker is backed by the Grease Band, two of whom, Chris Stainton and Henry McCullough, appeared on his first album. The Grease Band backed the singer at the Woodstock Festival in August 1969. However, Cocker would part ways with the group following the release of this record, citing a reluctance to tour; when they needed to meet live commitments in America, Cocker decided to organise a new band (the Mad Dogs and Englishmen) with the help of keyboardist Leon Russell, heralding a new musical direction for the singer on his subsequent studio releases.

The album charted in the UK in May 1972 at number 29 when it was re-released as a double pack with Cocker's first LP With a Little Help from My Friends. On its release, the album also charted at number 11 on the Billboard 200 in America, propelled by Cocker's well-received appearance with the Grease Band at Woodstock earlier in the year.

Track listing

Personnel
 Joe Cocker – vocals
 Chris Stainton – piano, organ, guitar, arrangements
 Leon Russell - piano, organ, guitar, arrangements
 Henry McCullough, Clarence White – guitar
 Sneaky Pete Kleinow – pedal steel guitar
 Alan Spenner – bass guitar
 Bruce Rowland, Paul Humphrey (miscredited as "Paul Humphries") – drums
 Milt Holland – percussion
 Merry Clayton, Bonnie Bramlett, Rita Coolidge, Patrice Holloway, Sherlie Matthews – backing vocals

Production notes
 Recorded at A&M Studios, Hollywood, CA, and Sunset Sound Studios, Hollywood, CA, 1969
 Produced by Denny Cordell and Leon Russell
 Engineered by Henry Lewy, Brian Ingoldsby
 Remixed and remastered by Glyn Johns

Chart performance

Certifications

References

1969 albums
Joe Cocker albums
Albums produced by Denny Cordell
Regal Zonophone Records albums
A&M Records albums
Stateside Records albums
Albums produced by Leon Russell
Albums recorded at Sunset Sound Recorders
Albums recorded at A&M Studios